Hēmeroskopeion was an ancient Greek city.

Its location is unknown but it has been suggested by some scholars (and rejected by others) that it existed on what is now the city of Dénia, the judicial seat of the comarca of Marina Alta in the province of Alicante, which is a division of the Valencian Community, Spain. Its name means watchtower in Greek and it reflects the first use of the lofty promontory as such. According to Strabo, it was a small city and was founded by the Massaliot Greeks together with another two neighbouring and equally small cities, the names of which have not survived. The city was later conquered by the Romans and it was named Dianium, whence the modern name. This town was situated on the cape then called Artemisium or Dianium, named from a temple of Ephesia Artemis built upon it (goddess Artemis was called Diana in Latin). Apart from its strategic location the city was equally important for the iron mines that existed nearby.

See also
 List of ancient Greek cities

References

Massalian colonies
Alicante
Marina Alta
Populated places of the Byzantine Empire